GA-binding protein subunit beta-1 is a protein that in humans is encoded by the GABPB1 gene.

This gene encodes the GA-binding protein transcription factor, beta subunit. This protein forms a tetrameric complex with the alpha subunit, and stimulates transcription of target genes. The encoded protein may be involved in activation of cytochrome oxidase expression and nuclear control of mitochondrial function. The crystal structure of a similar protein in mouse has been resolved as a ternary protein complex. Multiple transcript variants encoding distinct isoforms have been identified for this gene.

References

Further reading

External links 
 
 

Transcription factors